Salavat (also Romanized as Şalavāt; also known as Masjed Şalavāt) is a village in Salavat Rural District of Moradlu District, Meshgin Shahr County, Ardabil province, Iran. At the 2006 census, its population was 970 in 200 households. The following census in 2011 counted 674 people in 171 households. The latest census in 2016 showed a population of 694 people in 210 households; it was the largest village in its rural district.

References 

Meshgin Shahr County

Towns and villages in Meshgin Shahr County

Populated places in Ardabil Province

Populated places in Meshgin Shahr County